Marlin & Associates (M&A) is a New York City based boutique investment banking and strategic advisory firm, advising owners and managers of U.S. and international companies in the technology, digital information, and healthcare-related sectors.

Over the past ten years the firm has been recognized with numerous awards:
"USA TMT Advisory Firm of Year" 2012 
“Middle Market Investment Banking Firm of the Year”
“Middle Market Financing Agent of the Year – Equity” 
Several “Deal-of-the-Year” awards in Financial Technology, Financial Services, and International Cross-Border  
 Awards for Middle Market Financing in Computer, Technology and Telecommunications

History
The firm  was founded in 2002 by Ken Marlin and he is now currently Managing Partner. The firm has advised on transactions involving some of the largest and most significant technology and information companies.

Operations
The company's headquarters are on the 48th floor of 570 Lexington Avenue in New York City. Marlin also has offices in San Francisco, Washington D.C., Toronto, and Hong Kong. There are currently 30 individuals working for the company across its offices. Marlin has sponsored an Information Industries Summit.

References

External links
Marlin & Associates website
BusinessWeek profile: Marlin & Associates
Bobsguide profile: Marlin & Associates (login required).

Investment banks in the United States
Strategic management
Financial services companies established in 2002
Companies based in New York City
Privately held companies based in New York (state)
2002 establishments in New York City